Rudolf Johannes Rasmussen (18 June 1918 – 25 September 1993) was a Danish cyclist. He competed in the individual and team road race events at the 1948 Summer Olympics, but failed to finish. His younger brother Jørgen Frank Rasmussen took part in the same events at the 1952 Olympics.

References

External links
 

1918 births
1993 deaths
Danish male cyclists
Olympic cyclists of Denmark
Cyclists at the 1948 Summer Olympics
Cyclists from Copenhagen